Irek (Cyrillic: Ирек) is a Tatar masculine given name that may refer to

Irek Faizullin (born 1962), Russian statesman and politician
Irek Gimayev (born 1957), Russian ice hockey defenceman
Irek Ganiyev (born 1986), Russian football player
Irek Hamidullin, Russian soldier 
Irek Kusmierczyk (born 1978), Canadian politician
Irek Mukhamedov (born 1960), Soviet-born British ballet dancer of Tatar origin
Irek Murtazin (born 1964), Russian journalist and blogger
Irek Rizaev (born 1997), Russian BMX rider
Irek Zaripov (born 1983), Russian biathlete and cross-country skier
Irek Zinnurov (born 1969), Russian water polo player 

Turkic masculine given names